The National Radical Union ( (ΕΡΕ), Ethnikī́ Rizospastikī́ Énōsis (ERE)) was a Greek political party formed in 1956 by Konstantinos Karamanlis, mostly out of the Greek Rally party.

History
ERE was a conservative, right-wing party, which also had some prominent centrist members, such as:
Panagiotis Kanellopoulos
Konstantinos Tsatsos, president of the Greek Republic from 1975 to 1980.
Evangelos Averoff, minister of foreign affairs in Karamanlis' governments (1955–1963) and leader of ND from 1981 to 1984.

Karamanlis resigned from the leadership of ERE in 1963 and was succeeded by Panagiotis Kanellopoulos. The cause of Karamanlis' resignation was the hotly contested elections of 1961 (known as elections of "violence and fraud"). According to official results, ERE won the elections. But the opposition Centre Union and United Democratic Left accused the government of Karamanlis of massive fraud, did not acknowledge the result, and  Centre Union's leader George Papandreou organised massive demonstrations ("uncompromising struggle") and called for new elections. Karamanlis felt gravely insulted and resigned from the Premiership and the leadership of the party. New elections were held in 1963 where ERE lost, and a year later, in 1964 which the Centre Union won with the second highest percentage in Greek history, 54 percent of the vote.

Kanellopoulos remained leader of the party until 1967, when he formed a government which did not last more than a month, as it was overthrown by the Greek military junta of 1967–1974. After 1967 ERE, like all political parties, was outlawed. It was never refounded.  Karamanlis formed a new party in 1974, New Democracy, which he himself described as being somewhat more moderate than the ERE.

Electoral history

Hellenic Parliament elections

References

Conservative parties in Greece
Eastern Orthodox political parties
History of Greece (1949–1974)
Defunct political parties in Greece
Political parties established in 1956
1956 establishments in Greece
1960s in Greek politics
Konstantinos Karamanlis
Right-wing parties in Europe
1974 disestablishments in Greece
Political parties disestablished in 1974
Banned political parties